Kamana, Queen of Jinga (died 1810) was the queen regnant of the Kingdom of Jinga (in modern-day Angola) from 1767 to 1810. 

She was the daughter of queen Ana III Guterres. 

In 1767, her mother was deposed and executed by her nephew Francisco II Kalwete ka Mbandi.  Her death resulted in a longgoing succession crisis, in which Kamala and her sister Princess Murili left for Kidona in Kwanza, where they proclaimed the Kingdom of Jinga under the rule of queen Kamana, contesting the right of Francisco II after their mother, and establishing a rival Kingdom within the borders of his own Kingdom. 

The conflict lasted until 1800, when Francisco II recognized the Kingdom of Jinga and acknowledged Kamala's right to rule there. The Kingdom of Ndongo and Matamba was not united until 1810, when Francisco II and Kamala both died and the Portuguese supported Kamala's son Ndala Kamana (d. 1833), when he successfully united the Kingdom under his own rule.

Issue
 Ndala Kamana (d. 1833), king of Ndongo and Matamba in 1810-1833.

References 

 Anthony Appiah, Henry Louis Gates,  Encyclopedia of Africa, Volym 1
 Fernando Campos: Conflitos na dinastia Guterres através da sua cronologia1, África: Revista do Centro de Estudos Africanos. USP, S. Paulo, 27-28: 23-43, 2006/2007

Queens regnant in Africa
18th-century women rulers
18th-century monarchs in Africa
19th-century women rulers
19th-century monarchs in Africa
1810 deaths
Angolan royalty